The Ambassador of Australia to Iran is an officer of the Australian Department of Foreign Affairs and Trade and the head of the Embassy of the Commonwealth of Australia to the Islamic Republic of Iran.

The current ambassador, since October 2019, is Lyndall Sachs.

Heads of mission

See also
List of Iranian Ambassadors to Australia
List of High Commissioners and Ambassadors from Australia

References

 
Australia
Iran